Edward Lewis was a photographer and filmmaker who documented prominent African Americans and their activities in his documentary film series. He worked as a photographer for the Daily News before becoming a filmmaker.

He made 12 documentary shorts for Million Dollar Productions in the Life in Harlem series in 1936.

Lewis made the film Colored America on Parade. Lewis also produced The Colored Champions of Sports.

Filmography
Life in Harlem (1938), 12 part documentary series for Million Dollar Productions
Colored Champions of Sports
Colored America on Parade

References

20th-century American photographers
American documentary filmmakers
African-American film directors
African-American photographers